Xavier Pentecôte (born 13 August 1986) is a French former professional footballer who played as a striker. He played for Toulouse, Bastia, and Nice.

Career
Born in Saint-Dié, Pentecôte joined Toulouse in 2001 and turned professional in 2004. He spent the 2007–08 season on loan at Bastia, and rejoined the Corsican club in January 2010 for a second loan spell. in August 2011, he completed a move to Ligue 1 rivals Nice, signing a four-year contract.

He retired in 2015 after recurring injury problems.

References

External links

1986 births
Living people
People from Saint-Dié-des-Vosges
Sportspeople from Vosges (department)
French footballers
Association football forwards
Ligue 1 players
Ligue 2 players
Toulouse FC players
SC Bastia players
OGC Nice players
Footballers from Grand Est